Areta Rock is a rock  southeast of Mount Spann in the Panzarini Hills portion of the Argentina Range of the Pensacola Mountains. It was mapped by the United States Geological Survey from surveys and from U.S. Navy air photos, 1956–67, and was named by the Advisory Committee on Antarctic Names for Lieutenant Eduardo Ferrin Areta, an Argentine officer in charge at Ellsworth Station, winter 1961.

References 

Rock formations of Queen Elizabeth Land